Bergermoen is an industrial area on the border between the municipals Ringerike in Buskerud and Jevnaker in Oppland. The Norwegian kitchen manufacturer Norema has its main office here.

References

Ringerike (municipality)
Jevnaker